Lamar Delmarro Nelson is a Jamaican footballer who plays for Arnett Gardens F.C. in the top-flight Jamaica National Premier League. He is also known as "Wanka".

Club career 

Nelson started his senior career at Arnett Gardens F.C.

In 2013, Nelson signed with Waterhouse FC in the RSPL. After an extended layoff due to knee surgery, in June 2015, Nelson returned to Arnett Gardens.

International career 

He made his international début for Jamaica in a 0–0 with Martinique on 10 December 2012 in the 2012 Caribbean Cup.

References

External links 

1991 births
Living people
Jamaican footballers
Jamaica international footballers
Arnett Gardens F.C. players
Association football midfielders